The 1949 Volta a Catalunya was the 29th edition of the Volta a Catalunya cycle race and was held from 18 September to 25 September 1949. The race started in Montjuïc and finished in Barcelona. The race was won by Émile Rol.

General classification

References

1949
Volta
1949 in Spanish road cycling
Volta a Catalunya